Pitt Street railway station is a future underground rapid transit station located in the central business district of Sydney, Australia. The station forms part of Transport for New South Wales's Sydney Metro City & Southwest scheme. It is scheduled to open in 2024.

The name "Pitt Street" has been used during construction. In 2021, the Geographical Names Board proposed naming the station "Gadigal railway station".

References

External links
Pitt Street Metro station Sydney Metro

Proposed railway stations in Sydney
Railway stations scheduled to open in 2024